Ithiel de Sola Pool (October 26, 1917 – March 11, 1984) was an American academic who was a widely celebrated and often controversial figure in the field of social sciences and information technology. He did significant research on technology and its effects on society. He coined the term "convergence" to describe the effect of various scientific innovations on society in a futuristic world, and made predictions of ways that technology would impact society that were often prescient. In his 1983 book Technologies of Freedom, he predicted that digital electronics would allow convergence between historically separated modes of communication, and that these modes would eventually become one single grand system.

Early life and education

De Sola Pool was the son of David de Sola Pool, spiritual leader of the Sephardic Congregation Shearith Israel in New York City. His mother was Tamar Hirschensohn, the Palestine-born daughter of Rabbi Chaim Hirschensohn. His sister was Naomi de Sola Pool, a physician.

Pool was initially educated at an Ethical Culture School in New York City. He attended the University of Chicago, where he received a Bachelor of Arts in 1938, a Master of Arts in 1939, and his Ph.D. in 1952. The university was under the direction of Robert Maynard Hutchins, its president from 1929 to 1945, a period when it was called "the birthplace of modern American social sciences."

Career

During World War II, Pool went to Washington, D.C., where, under Harold Lasswell, he studied and researched the effects of Nazi and communist propaganda. He held academic appointments at Stanford University, and at Massachusetts Institute of Technology, where he joined the MIT Center for International Studies. He remained at MIT for more than 30 years, researching the effects of communication technology on global politics.

Work

De Sola Pool's earliest interest was the study of rhetorical symbols of democracy, in which he analyzed speechmakers of totalitarian regimes to decipher the power and influence of words. However, he always returned to his fascination with technology and communications.

He was instrumental in establishing the small world hypothesis now known as the Six Degrees of Separation.

He eventually became the leading authority on the social and political effects of communications. In 1973, his name appeared in The Communications Handbook, where he defined the social and political effects of technological advances in a chapter called "Public Opinion." In 1983, Pool proved to be at the forefront of research into the ramifications of technological innovations in communication with publications such as "Forecasting Telephone and Communication Flows." He studied the rise of electronic media, noting that print media was becoming more expensive per word published, while the opposite was true for electronic media. In his 1983 publication "Tracking the flow of information science", he made a series of predictions that came to accurately describe 21st century communication: growing quickly and increasingly electronic, with people experiencing information overload and fragmented streams of information.

Pool was reunited with his former mentors Roger Hurwitz and Hirshue Inose to co-author the work A Census of Japan and the US. This would become one of his last forays into the literary world. He once again defined demand toward a global information society.

De Sola Pool was the chair and founder of the MIT political science department. He was often pulled away from MIT to advise the United States and other governments on various matters. In 1965, he wrote "The Kaiser, the Tsar, and the Computer," an essay about a computer-simulated international crisis. Later, his interest in quantitative analysis and communications would contribute to computer models to study human behavior.

The idea of freedom in all forms was extremely important to Pool. As a young man, Pool was a devout Trotskyite, though he quickly became disillusioned with this form of politics after seeing people's ideals used to take away the freedom for which they had initially fought.

Simulmatics Corporation 
De Sola Pool was one of the leaders of the Simulmatics Corporation, a data science firm which used algorithms to target voters and consumers. Jill Lepore wrote extensively about the Simulmatics Corporation in her 2020 book If, Then: How the Simulmatics Corporation Invented the Future.

Controversies 
Pool's work with the Simulmatics Corporation included Department of Defense contracts to predict counter-insurgencies in Vietnam; he also was involved in Simulmatics' efforts to predict where race riots would occur in the United States. Daniel Ellsberg would later say of Pool, "I thought of him as the most corrupt social scientist I had ever met, without question." Much of the work Pool led for Simulmatics in Vietnam was also of very low quality; one of his collaborators, a PhD in psychology, believed that Pool did not know what a null hypothesis was, saying, "He didn't know why he couldn't conclude that TV was having no effect if he couldn’t measure it." Pool's work for the government made him an extremely controversial figure, both within social sciences and on the MIT Campus in the late 1960s; many students reviled him. In 1969, protesters called Pool a "war criminal." Simulmatics went bust shortly thereafter.

Beginning in 1975, Pool protested the growing power of Institutional Review Boards (IRBs). His first involvement in IRB issues was when an MIT IRB told one of Pool's colleagues he could not interview Boston antibusing activists, reasoning that his colleague's research could be used against the criminals. Pool believed that much social science work was roughly equivalent to journalism and deserved equal protections against prior restraint.

Personal life
While at the University of Chicago, he met Judith Graham, who became an important researcher in hemophilia. They married in 1938, when she was a sophomore. Their first son, Jonathan, was born in 1942, and son Jeremy followed in 1945. The de Sola Pools divorced in 1953. In 1956 Ithiel married Jean Natalie MacKenzie (1919-2001).  From that marriage they had one child Adam MacKenzie de Sola Pool.

Legacy
Pool died in 1984 from cancer. At that point in his career, he was a member of the Council on Foreign Relations, advising several countries around the world. Pool felt that the world was underestimating the importance of communications and technical change. His greatest legacy was his book Technologies of Freedom (1983).

The American Political Science Association has established an Ithiel de Sola Pool prize that is awarded every three years. The Salzburg Global Seminar has established a prize lecture in the name of Ithiel de Sola Pool.

Contributions to social sciences
 Quantitative Analysis - Three Major Advances
 The study of Nazi WWII propaganda and symbols of freedom in speeches of Political leaders.
 Analysis of Political elites = those in power.
 First computer simulation in decision making during crises.

Selected publications
 The Social Impact of the Telephone
 Technologies of Freedom
 Technology without Boundaries
 Politics in a Wired Nation
 The Small World
 Forecasting the Telephone: A Retrospective Technology Assessment of the Telephone

References

External links

Guide to the Ithiel de Sola Pool Papers 1935-1948 at the University of Chicago Special Collections Research Center

1917 births
1984 deaths
American Sephardic Jews
University of Chicago alumni
American social scientists
Communication theorists
American people of Palestinian-Jewish descent
Stanford University faculty
Massachusetts Institute of Technology faculty